Richard Leonard Arnold Schoemaker (5 October 1886 – 3 May 1942) was a Dutch Olympic fencer, engineer in the Royal Netherlands East Indies Army, professor of architecture at Bandung Institute of Technology and Delft University of Technology, and leader of a resistance group during World War II, for which he was executed at the Sachsenhausen concentration camp.

He competed in the individual sabre event at the 1908 Summer Olympics. He was one of 95 people who, most posthumously, received the Dutch Cross of Resistance. The street forming the eastern border of the Delft University campus is named Schoemakerstraat after him.

References

External links
 

1886 births
1942 deaths
People from Roermond
Graduates of the Koninklijke Militaire Academie
Dutch male fencers
Olympic fencers of the Netherlands
Fencers at the 1908 Summer Olympics
Royal Netherlands East Indies Army officers
Dutch expatriates in Indonesia
Dutch military engineers
Dutch architects
Academic staff of Bandung Institute of Technology
Academic staff of the Delft University of Technology
Dutch resistance members
Dutch civilians killed in World War II
People who died in Sachsenhausen concentration camp
Recipients of the Dutch Cross of Resistance
Resistance members who died in Nazi concentration camps
Dutch people who died in Nazi concentration camps
Sportspeople from Limburg (Netherlands)